4th Regiment may refer to:

Australia
4th Regiment, Royal Australian Artillery
4th Light Horse Regiment (Australia)
4th Combat Engineer Regiment (Australia)

France
4th Infantry Regiment (France)

Greece
 4th Infantry Regiment (Greece)
 4th Archipelago Regiment
 4/41 Evzone Regiment

Italy
4th Mountain Artillery Regiment (Italy)

Lithuania 

 4th Infantry Regiment (Lithuania)
 4th Lithuanian Vanguard Regiment

Philippine Commonwealth
4th Infantry Regiment (Philippine Commonwealth Army)
4th Infantry Regiment (Philippine Constabulary) - The military establishment of the 4th Infantry Regiment of the Philippine Constabulary was active on 1935 to 1942 and 1944 to 1946 under the U.S. military command and they stationed in Southern Luzon, Mindoro and Palawan.

Poland
4th Regiment of Line Infantry, a unit of Kingdom of Poland created in 1815, known by its nick-name Czwartacy

United Kingdom
 4th Regiment of Foot
 4th Regiment Royal Artillery

United States
 4th Continental Artillery Regiment
 4th Air Defense Artillery Regiment
 4th Field Artillery Regiment
 4th Regiment, New York State Artillery (redesignated as the 1st Battalion, 258th Field Artillery (United States))
 4th Cavalry Regiment (United States)
 4th Infantry Regiment (United States)
 4th United States Colored Infantry Regiment
 4th Marine Regiment (United States)